Group 10 secretory phospholipase A2 is an enzyme that in humans is encoded by the PLA2G10 gene.

References

Further reading